The European Foundation for Management Development (EFMD) is an international not-for-profit association based in Brussels. Europe's largest network association in the field of management development, it has over 890 member organizations from academia, business, public service and consultancy in 88 countries (as of September 2017). EFMD provides a forum for networking in management development.

EFMD operates the EFMD Quality Improvement System (EQUIS), which is one of the leading international systems of quality assessment, improvement, and accreditation of higher education institutions in management and business administration. It is comparable to its American equivalent Association to Advance Collegiate Schools of Business and provides a forum for information, research, networking and debate on innovation and best practice in management development.

The foundation also runs the EFMD Programme Accreditation System (EPAS) for programmes as well as the EFMD Deans Across Frontiers development programme (EDAF) and the Business School Impact System (BSIS).

Types of accreditation 

While the EQUIS accreditation process, which is valid for an entire school (or faculty), is the main type of accreditation EFMD offers, there are a variety of other accreditations available. With EPAS it is possible for business schools to have certain degree programs accredited rather than the entire school. This variant somewhat resembles the AMBA (Association of MBAs) accreditation, as the London-based Association accredits the school's entire portfolio of MBA programs, but does not accredit the entire business school. EFMD also offers an accreditation for online courses (EOCCS) and for corporate learning (CLIP).

EFMD activities 

EFMD is the European partner in the China Europe International Business School (CEIBS), a joint venture with Shanghai Jiaotong University established as the first international business school with autonomous status in 1994 under an agreement between the European Commission and the Chinese Ministry of Foreign Trade and Economic Cooperation. 
EFMD is also founding partner of the Global Foundation for Management Education (GFME), which is a joint venture with the US-based Association to Advance Collegiate Schools of Business (AACSB International). EFMD organizes conferences and seminars around the world for management development industry and published the Global Focus magazine.

In 2009, EFMD received an EU grant worth €2.2m for a project that aims to improve the efficiency of Cuban companies by providing training to senior managers. This project, called Consolidating and Strengthening Cuban Managerial Capabilities, is to be implemented under the leadership of EFMD together with ESADE, a business school in Barcelona, and the Cuban Ministry of Higher Education.

References

External links
official website

Educational organisations based in Belgium
Educational organizations based in Europe
1972 establishments in Belgium
Educational institutions established in 1972
Higher education organisations based in Europe
Management education